The 2016 Bulgarian Basketball Cup was the 62nd edition of the annual cup tournament in Bulgaria.It is managed by the Bulgarian Basketball Federation and was held in Botevgrad, in the Arena Botevgrad on February 18–21, 2016. Rilski Sportist won their 1st cup.
Tony Gugino was named MVP.

Qualified teams
The first eight teams qualified after the first stage of the 2015–16 NBL regular season .

Bracket

References

Bulgarian Basketball Cup
Cup